Mike Di Meglio (born 17 January 1988) is a French Grand Prix motorcycle road racer and three-time world champion claiming the 2008 125cc title, as well as winning the 2022 & 2017-2018 FIM Endurance World Championship. Since the 2018-2019 FIM EWC season, Di Meglio has raced for F.C.C. TSR Honda France. From 2019 on, he also competes in the MotoE World Cup aboard an Energica Ego Corsa. He twice won the 24 Hours of Le Mans endurance race in 2017 on Yamaha and in 2020 on the Honda CBR. He also twice won the Bol d'Or 24-hour motorcycle endurance race on Circuit Paul Ricard. In 2017 Yamaha and 2018 Honda.

Di Meglio first came to the attention of the Fédération Française de Motocyclisme (French Motorcycle Federation) 2002 Prix de l'Avenir. He also took a trial with the Liegois team in Carole, with whom he took part in a Spanish Championship race. Later he raced at world championship level between 2003 and 2015.

Early life
Di Meglio was born in Toulouse. Of Italian descent, his paternal grandfather was born in Lentini (Province of Siracusa).

Career

125cc World Championship

2003
When Di Meglio turned 15 years old, he decided to accept offers by the Italian Freesoul Racing Team on Aprilia to debut in the 125cc world championship in 2003. Although he managed to score points, including 13th place at Catalunya, it was a difficult season for him, crashing often and not achieving good results. Later, at the mid-season, he was offered by the Italian MetaSystem Rg Service to replace Italian veteran Andrea Ballerini, but this time the team was on Honda, he tried to attempt to achieve his goals, but he failed to improve and didn't score any championship points.

2004
After a disappointing 2003, Di Meglio vowed to salvage a wrecked debut. He signed with Globet.com Racing on Aprilia alongside Gino Borsoi for the 2004 Grand Prix motorcycle racing season. The start was promising with a front-row start and a fifth-place finish at South Africa, but he failed to be consistent due to several crashes.

2005
Di Meglio was their official rider on board on a factory Honda RS125RW along with Fabrizio Lai but it was under the Kopron Racing World name. His performance improved, scoring points regularly. He performed heroically at the French Grand Prix by fighting for a podium position, finishing fourth and making his home fans happy and entertained. However, it was his podium finish in the wet British Grand Prix by finishing second place behind Julián Simón, which gave him a reputation as a wet weather expert. He also finished a credible fourth place in the hot Qatar Grand Prix ahead of future 125cc champion Thomas Lüthi. The high point of the season for the Frenchman was his controversial win at the Turkish Grand Prix, when Mika Kallio crashed and race leader Luthi had run wide to avoid him.

2006
The FFM Honda GP 125 team also provided him with a factory bike just like the previous season, but despite his big ambitions and a factory bike, he suffered an injury, and scored in only four races that resulted in eight points. He left the team immediately for Team Scot the following year after Portugal as the result of his performance with the team.

2007
For , Di Meglio returned to Team Scot, the team that had helped him win his first Grand Prix in 2005. He was teamed with the young Italian Stefano Musco. In the first few races, he managed to score championship points. He had a very bad crash during the qualifying session of the Spanish Grand Prix, breaking his collarbone and was forced to miss the Turkish Grand Prix as a result. He returned in China to a fourteenth-place finish and followed that with a ninth place at Le Mans. A front row start at Mugello did not come to much either as he crashed out on the third lap of the race. After this, several disappointing race results followed except in the wet race at Donington, where he finished in sixth place and in Japan, where he finished fourth despite crashing out of second place while chasing race leader Mattia Pasini.

2008
For , he was offered to ride with the Finnish Ajo Motorsport, teamed with Dominique Aegerter. He returned to Aprilia machines, but officially rides for Aprilia's sister Piaggio company, Derbi. He is riding the Derbi RSA 125 factory bike. His campaign started slowly within Qatar finishing in fourth, beaten to the podium at the line by Stefan Bradl. In Spain and Portugal, Di Meglio picked up minor points and trailed title contender Simone Corsi, but starting in China, Corsi's pace started to slip away including a crash from a minor incident with Lorenzo Zanetti and reigning world champion Gábor Talmácsi struggling that allow Di Meglio to take full advantage. A win in the shortened French Grand Prix started a consistent run lasting until at San Marino where he crashed out while fighting for third place with Corsi. At the Australian Grand Prix, Di Meglio became the only second Frenchman to win the world championship after Arnaud Vincent.

250cc World Championship

2009

For , he moved up to the 250cc class with the Aspar Team, alongside Álvaro Bautista. In his debut race in Qatar he qualified third but dropped to 11th on lap 1, before fighting back. He ran fifth in the later stages, but aggressively passed Bautista on the final lap before passing Raffaele de Rosa for third. He did not take another top five finish until round ten at Donington, but hit form from this point on. He took pole at Indianapolis, and claimed second place at Estoril in a photo-finish with Héctor Barberá. He was fighting for top rookie honours with de Rosa but lost out to him as a result of crashing out in Valencia while de Rosa finished third.

Moto2 World Championship

2010
The  saw the debut of the Moto2 class as the new intermediate class of Grand Prix racing, replacing the 250cc class. Di Meglio failed to take full advantage of it, with several poor race finishes in the first three races of the season and a crash at Mugello. Di Meglio took his first points-scoring finishes at British and Dutch rounds with seventh and eighth respectively. Despite his good results at those rounds, he failed to be competitive again until Australia where he finished in sixth place, having started on the front row.

2011
In , Di Meglio moved to Tech3's Moto2 programme, finishing in 23rd place.

2012
In , Di Meglio split his season between the Speed Up, MZ, and Kiefer Racing teams. He ultimately improved to 22nd place in the championship.

2013
He finished the season in 20th position.

MotoGP World Championship

2014
He finished his rookie season in 25th place with 9 points, last of all the season regular riders.

2015
For 2015, Di Meglio was retained by Avintia, this time riding a one-year-old Ducati GP14. Despite scoring fewer points than the previous season, he made a slight improvement to finish in 24th place on the season. At the close of the season, Di Meglio was dropped by Avintia in favour of compatriot Loris Baz.

FIM Endurance World Championship

2016–2017
Following his dismissal from the MotoGP class, Di Meglio moved to endurance racing in the FIM Endurance World Championship with the successful French GMT94 Yamaha team, partnering riders Niccolò Canepa and David Checa. The team achieved wins at the 24 Heures Motos, Oschersleben 8 Hours, and 8 Hours of Slovakia Ring, leading GMT94 to their third team's championship and helping Yamaha to the manufacturer's championship. As Di Meglio did not compete in the first race of the season, the Bol d'Or, he was classified 3rd in the rider's championship behind his teammates and members of the Suzuki Endurance Racing Team.

2017–2018
The following season, Di Meglio remained with GMT94 and teammates Canepa and Checa. The team achieved one win at the Bol d'Or and ultimately finished the season in 2nd place behind F.C.C. TSR Honda France.

2018–2019
For 2018–2019, Di Meglio switched to F.C.C. TSR Honda France, replacing compatriot Alan Techer to partner Joshua Hook and Freddy Foray. They achieved wins at the Bol d'Or and Oschersleben 8 Hours, finishing the teams' and riders' championships in 2nd place behind Team SRC Kawasaki France.

MotoE World Cup

2019
In late 2018, Di Meglio was confirmed to be rejoining the Grand Prix paddock as part of the inaugural MotoE season, racing for Marc VDS. He achieved a third-place podium in the German opener, followed by a grand slam in Austria (pole, win, and fastest lap), but subsequent retirements and poor finishes relegated him to just 6th position at the conclusion of the season.

Career statistics

Grand Prix motorcycle racing

By season

By class

Races by year
(key) (Races in bold indicate pole position, races in italics indicate fastest lap)

References

External links

 
 
 Team Aspar web site (archived from 2010)

125cc World Championship riders
250cc World Championship riders
French motorcycle racers
1988 births
Living people
Sportspeople from Toulouse
French people of Italian descent
French people of Sicilian descent
Moto2 World Championship riders
Avintia Racing MotoGP riders
Supersport World Championship riders
MotoGP World Championship riders
MotoE World Cup riders
125cc World Riders' Champions